The fifth season of the Australian Dancing with the Stars TV series premiered on Tuesday 26 September 2006 and concluded on Tuesday 28 November 2006. A controversy occurred in the semi-final when judge Todd McKenney said that he believed Arianne Caoili had received professional dance lessons prior to the competition. Caoili denied this. Channel 7's Today Tonight supported McKenney's claims, producing video footage of Caoili attending salsa classes, but Caoili said she just started taking salsa lessons when the producers called to offer her a place on the show.

Anthony Koutoufides and his partner Natalie Lowe won the series, with Arianne Caoili and her partner Carmelo Pizzino as runner-up.

Couples 
The following celebrities were featured.

Scoring chart
Red numbers indicate the couples with the lowest score for each week.
Green numbers indicate the couples with the highest score for each week.
 indicates the couple (or couples) eliminated that week.
 indicates the returning couple that finished in the bottom two.
 indicates the couple withdrew from the competition.
 indicates the winning couple.
 indicates the runner-up couple.
 indicates the third-place couple.

In Week 7, special guest judge Dicko was part of the judging panel, and scores were out of 50 instead of 40.

Dance Schedule
The celebrities and professional partners will dance one of these routines for each corresponding week.

Week 1 : Cha-cha-cha or Waltz
Week 2 : Quickstep or Rumba
Week 3 : Jive or Tango
Week 4 : Foxtrot or Paso doble
Week 5 : Samba
Week 6 : One unlearned Ballroom or Latin dance from weeks 1-5
Week 7 : One unlearned Ballroom or Latin dance from weeks 1-6
Week 8 : Two unlearned Ballroom or Latin dances from weeks 1-7
Week 9 : Learned Ballroom or Latin dance from weeks 1-8 & Argentine Tango
Week 10 : Two Favourite Dances of the Season & Freestyle

Dance Chart

 Highest Scoring Dance
 Lowest Scoring Dance

Average Chart
The average chart is based on the dances performed by the celebrities and not their place in the competition.
Dicko's marks were excluded for this table.

Highest and lowest scoring performances
The best and worst performances in each dance according to the judges' 40-point scale are as follows (guest judges scores are excluded):

Couples' highest and lowest scoring dances
Scores are based upon a 40-point maximum:

Running Order

Week 1 
Individual judges scores in the chart below (given in parentheses) are listed in this order from left to right: Todd, Helen, Paul, Mark.

Running order

Week 2
Musical guests: 
Running order

Week 3
Musical guests: 
Running order

Week 4
Musical guests: Ronan Keating
Running order

Week 5
Musical guests: Guy Sebastian
Running order

Week 6
Musical guests: 
Running order

Week 7 
Individual judges scores in the chart below (given in parentheses) are listed in this order from left to right: Todd, Helen, Paul, Mark, Dicko.
Musical guests:
Running order

Week 8
Musical guests:
Running order

Week 9
Musical guests:
Running order

Week 10
Musical guests: Human Nature, Rogue Traders, Shannon Noll & Natalie Bassingthwaighte
Running order

References

Season 05
2006 Australian television seasons